Hauterive Castle (Château d'Hauterive) is a castle located in Argentré, within the department of Mayenne. The castle has been a registered monument since March 13, 1989.

References

Châteaux in Mayenne